This article describes smaller collegiate sororities created in nineteenth century and early to middle
twentieth century on campuses in the United States and Canada. These sororities are defunct. Individual chapters may have affiliated with National Panhellenic Conference (NPC) sororities.

Aloquin 
Aloquin was founded as a co-educational organization in 1905 at Ohio University called The Union. As a co-ed organization, its purpose was "to raise social and moral standards of college life." 

Splitting along gender lines in 1910, the men became affiliated with Phrenocon, a national association which would go on to rename itself Phi Kappa Tau in 1916, while on September 12 1912, the 65 women of the Ohio University Union became Aloquin. The name was created from the combination of the Latin words for "why not?" This was quickly extended to "Why not strengthen? Why not encourage?" Its aim was to "promote a spirit of democracy and equality." They hoped to establish high ideals of college work. They wanted to "foster principles which will develop integrity, morality, and strength of character. ... best type of womanhood... bond of union between students and alma mater."

Aloquin's colors were  blue and  gold. The pin was an "A" set with sixteen pearls.

The sorority held a convention in Athens Ohio on December 12, 1913. A national president and a general secretary were elected.

Aloquin sorority chartered two more chapters: 
 Alpha, Ohio University, 1905
 Beta ?, Ohio State University, 1914
 Gamma ?, Wittenberg College, 1915

Ohio University's chapter affiliated with Zeta Tau Alpha in 1922; OSU's went with Chi Omega in 1919; Wittenburg's reorganized as Theta Gamma Rho in 1918, and later, became a chapter of Kappa Delta in 1927.

Of the OSU chapter, Chi Omega's history recalled that the Aloquins "decided that there would be many more advantages derived from membership in a national fraternity than from a local state organization." (Ferguson, p. 188)

Beta Delta Pi (ΒΔΠ) 
The Alpha chapter began as D.D.D. in January, 1887 at Bucknell Female Institute. On September 15, 1887, the sorority changed its name to Beta Delta Pi. Little else is known about this sorority. A Beta chapter was chartered at Miss Gordon's Private School in Philadelphia. The Lambda chapter was colonized at Toronto in 1914. Lambda chapter decided "something must be done to strengthen our position nationally." (Alpha Gamma Delta Quarterly, p. 89). 

The sorority was "renewed" in 1916 (Women of Today, 1925).

The 1917 edition of Toronto's yearbook gave the following chapters: 
 Alpha, Bucknell Female Institute, Lewisburg, Pennsylvania
 Beta, Philadelphia, Pennsylvania
 Gamma, New York City, New York
 Delta, Stamford, Connecticut
 Epsilon, Chevy Chase, Maryland
 Eta, Peekskill-on-the-Hudson, New York
 Theta, Hollidaysburg, Pennsylvania
 Iota, Atlantic City, New Jersey
 Lambda, Toronto, Canada

The Lambda chapter of Beta Delta Pi affiliated with Alpha Gamma Delta in early 1919.

The colors were:  nile green and  pink (L'Agenda 1895).

Delta Chi Alpha (ΔΧΑ) 
Delta Chi Alpha was one of the first Greek-lettered organizations for collegiate women. It was founded in May 1878 at Ohio Wesleyan University. The badge was silver with a monogram of the letters "encircled by a frosted wreath" (Baird's 1879). 

The colors were  cardinal and  ecru. In 1879, the membership was twenty-five.

In 1882, the fraternity established a Beta chapter at Beaver College. (The Phi Gamma Delta 1882, p. 76).
 Alpha, Ohio Wesleyan University, 1878
 Beta, Beaver College, 1882

Alpha chapter, at Ohio Wesleyan, affiliated with Kappa Alpha Theta (Baird's 1898). It is not known what happened to Beta chapter.

Kappa Sigma Tau (ΚΣΤ) 
Kappa Sigma Tau existed at Northwestern University prior to World War I. In 1919, the group reorganized as Campus Club but could not compete with the Y.W.C.A. In April 1922, the group became the Kahniga fraternity. There were 22 founders. The name was soon changed to Kappa Sigma Tau. It collapsed "during the war years".

Baird's (1930) gives the roll as follows:

 Alpha, Northwestern University, 1922 
 Beta, Illinois, 1924
 Gamma, Mississippi, 1927
 Delta, Lake Forest College, 1928

There was a national council meeting at a convention. The journal was The Gold and White. 

The badge was "a gold crescent with a row of ten pearls on the left side and one pearl at the point on the right. Gold letters spelling Kappa Sigma Tau are placed vertically on a raised onyx crescent in the center of the badge" (Baird's 1930, p. 602).
The colors were  Gold and  White.
The flower was the yellow rose. yellow rose.
The coat-of-arms was "on a fess between three mullets in chief and a lamp in bend a pair of balances. Crest is a crescent" (Butterfield, p. 46).

The Lake Forest's Delta chapter affiliated with Alpha Xi Delta in 1932. The other three dissolved.

Phi Delta (ΦΔ) 

Phi Delta was created from the combination of two local sororities: Sigma Epsilon (New York University, 1919) and Alpha Delta Omicron (New York State Teachers College at Albany). These two groups came together to form Phi Delta on 19 January, 1927. (Although October 25, 1919, the founding date of the eldest unit was explained as the official founding date). Baird's (1930) stated the objects are "to create a friendly spirit among the girls of the institutions represented, to uphold the honor spirit of the institution, and to develop the abilities of members for most effective college life" (p. 322).

By 1930, there were six active chapters, apparently coming from six different local chapters, with a total of 223 members:
 Alpha, New York State Teachers College at Albany [Phi Delta], 1919
 Beta, New York University (NYU) [Sigma Epsilon], 1919
 Gamma, UCLA [Pi Sigma], 1927
 Epsilon, Cincinnati [Phi Beta], 1927
 Zeta, George Washington University [Alpha Sigma Theta], 1927
 Eta, Temple University [Phi Alpha], 1929

SUNY Albany's online archives state that Phi Delta was founded for Protestant women, and that it was the first sorority for Protestant women founded at a state university.

Baird's (1930) described the insignia thus: "The badge is a Phi, studded with pearls, superimposed upon a plain gold Delta. The pledge pin is a black shield with a gold sword and star. Colors are  gold and  black. The flower is the yellow tea rose" (p. 322). 

The Phi Delt was the bi-monthly magazine.

Butterfield (p. 42) described the coat-of-arms as "...sable a sinister bend or, superimposed by a white open book proper on which in turn is superimposed a torch palewise, or, flamed argent. [With a] Crest. An eagle displayed, or" ("or" meaning "golden", in heraldry). The motto was the sorority's name, which was placed on the banner underneath the shield.

Phi Delta suffered from the Great Depression. In 1935, the NYU and GWU chapters affiliated with Beta Phi Alpha; Cincinnati became an Alpha Delta Pi chapter. UCLA struggled for a short time as a local, and ultimately dissolved. Albany remained a local until 1973 (Baird's).

Phi Delta (local) 
For the next 40 years, Alpha chapter functioned as a typical social sorority. The chapter had residences at 146 and 278 Western Ave (SUNY Albany archives). The Constitution (1967) gives the purpose of the sorority
as a social and fraternal organization, shall be to uphold the honor Spirit of the University, to create a friendlier spirit among the girls of the University, to strengthen the scholastic standing of the University, and to develop the abilities of the girls for the benefit of the college life.

Article IV, Section VII of the Constitution (1967) explained that Phi Delta permitted honorary membership to those men and women who have shown distinguished ability in the field of education and leadership, and possess such qualities as Phi Delta stands for; and men and women who have shown sincere interest and have given service to Phi Delta, upon election.

Section X of the same Article explained faculty membership as a man or woman of the University faculty who has shown distinguished ability in the field of education and leadership.

During the 1960s, Phi Delta opened membership to African- American and Jewish women (SUNY Albany archives).

In 1973, the sorority dissolved.

Sigma Sigma Delta (ΣΣΔ) 
On November 11, 1924, the society Lanterna Laetitiae was organized at Bucknell University. Four years later, their decision to become a national organization prompted the name change to Sigma Sigma Delta. The sorority had "open membership as a fundamental principle" (Bucknell University website).

Four additional chapters were chartered: Susquehanna, Northwestern, Baldwin-Wallace, Ohio Marietta (Baird's).

Northwestern's came from the local Aeukiga and Baldwin-Wallace's from the Calumet Club (Baird's).

In Ohio Marietta's catalogue (1933), the sorority is listed as "Sigma Sigma Delta National Open Sorority" (p. 23)

By 1938, all chapters had dissolved or disaffiliated. Northwestern's went to Phi Omega Pi. Baldwin-Wallace's reorganized as local Theta Tau Delta, then affiliated with Phi Mu.

The sorority's official colors were  green and  white.

Its flower was the white carnation. 

Its publication was The Evergreen. (L'Agenda).

References 

1. Butterfield, Emily H. (1931) College Fraternity Heraldry. The Collegiate Press: George Banta Publishing Co, Menasha, WI.
2. Baird's Manual of American College Fraternities, multiple editions. Baird's Manual is also available online here: The Baird's Manual Online Archive homepage.
3. The Phi Gamma Delta by Phi Gamma Delta, 1882, v. 1-4, Jan 1879- June 1882.
4. Constitution, Alpha chapter of Phi Delta, Fall 1967.
5. State University of New York Albany, M.E. Grenander Department of Special Collections and Archives
6. Bucknell University, History of Women at Bucknell, 1916 to 1925
7. Catalogue, Ohio Marietta College, 1931.
8. L'Agenda, yearbook of Bucknell University
9. Ferguson, Christelle (1938). A History of Chi Omega, Volume 1, The Collegiate Press, George Banta Publishing Company, Menasha Wisconsin.
10. Women of Today, 1925, Published by Women of Today Press.
11. Alpha Gamma Delta Quarterly, v. 10 (1919), published by Alpha Gamma Delta.
12. Bucknell Departmental History, 1886- 1895

Defunct fraternities and sororities
Sororities